New Salem is an unincorporated community in Redbank Township, Armstrong County, Pennsylvania, United States. It has also been known as Salem.

History
New Salem was laid out between 1850 and 1853. New Salem appears in the 1876 Atlas of Armstrong County, Pennsylvania. A post office called Pierce was established in 1853 and remained in operation until 1932.

References

Unincorporated communities in Armstrong County, Pennsylvania
Unincorporated communities in Pennsylvania